The Kuroda Cabinet is the second Cabinet of Japan led by Kuroda Kiyotaka from April 30, 1888 to October 25, 1889.

Cabinet

References 

Cabinet of Japan
1888 establishments in Japan
Cabinets established in 1888
Cabinets disestablished in 1889